Shenandoah is one of the first Neighborhoods in the City of Miami. It was established in 1919 by developers from Virginia, and hence the name. The "Shenandoah" area was farmland and piney wood until the real-estate boom of the 1920s, when one residential subdivision after another bearing the name "Shenandoah" as part of its title appeared. 
The modern borders of the neighborhood are Calle Ocho to the north, Coral Way to the south, SW 12th Ave to the east and SW 27th Ave to the west. 
Shenandoah is home to many revivalist architecture homes and buildings, such as Shenandoah Middle School and many homes in the area closer to Calle Ocho.

Education
Miami-Dade County Public Schools operates the area's public schools:

Elementary school
Shenandoah Elementary School

Middle school
Shenandoah Middle School

Libraries
Miami-Dade Public Library System operates this public library:
Shenandoah Library

Parks
Shenandoah Park

See also
 Coral Way
 Miami Shenandoah Neighborhood Association

References

External links

Neighborhoods in Miami